Ọba kò so (The King Did Not Hang) is a play by Duro Ladipo depicting the mystical and ambivalent personality known as Shango of Yoruba mythology.

Historical and Cultural Significance
Duro Ladipo's revolutionary play, Oba Kò So, was first staged in 1963 at the Mbari Mayo Club in Osogbo, Nigera as part of an anniversary celebration for the opening of the city's arts centre, notably the same year that Nigeria was declared a republic. Not only did Oba Kò So gain national recognition, but it gained international recognition, as the German Cultural Center in Lagos staged it in 1963, prompting its appearance in a cultural festival in Berlin called the Berliner Festwochen in 1964. The reviews of the Berlin audience highly revered its performance, describing it as one of the “great highlights of the festival”. Ladipo's company was then invited to perform Oba Kò So for the Commonwealth Tour throughout Europe starting in 1965 and continued to perform throughout Europe in addition to being adapted and filmed as a feature of BBC. In 1975, Duro Ladipo sought to extend his international influence and tour in other parts of the Diaspora and America. The tour of Oba Kò So in Brazil is particularly notable due to the immense respect it received, as the Yoruba traditions and mythology connected the audiences to their own living traditions of Santería that have roots in Nigeria.  Later in 1975, Oba Kò So toured the United States as part of the Third World Theatre Festival performing in theaters across the country. The Yoruba traditions brought to life on stage represented a new kind of energy and exhilaration that was incomparable to other theater experiences, as audience members described the music and drumming as “vigorous and rich” and the dance as “enervating”. Much of the success of Oba Kò So was in part due to the uniqueness of his creative vision to merge a mythological and human form into the character of Sango, in which Ladipo played himself, as his embodiment of this Yoruba deity reflected a deep personal and cultural connection Ladipo had to the worship of Sango and Yoruba traditions in general.

One of main innovations of Oba Kò So was that it departed from the traditional Yoruba folk opera and entered into new postcolonial chapter of Yoruba theater that aimed to reclaim the traditional Yoruba poetry, music and dance rituals that were denounced by the European colonial powers that promoted the retelling of stories from the Bible and Christian traditions. This play served a larger purpose that reflected the personal journey of Duro Ladipo and many others in reconciling the conflicting influences of Christianity enforced by the colonial authority as well as their ancestral roots of Yoruba traditions. Not only did Ladipo set the precedent for new thematic construction in Yoruba theater with Oba Kò So, but the people he chose to work was an act of resistance in itself, as his recruiting process did not revolve around schooling as done under colonial direction, but rather the merit of their contributions to Yoruba art forms. In a way, Ladipo included his actors, dancers, musicians, and singer in the opportunity to rewrite the history of Yoruba culture as they were all at the forefront of the creation process, contributing their personal experiences as content for the characters of the play.

Background
Shango is the protagonist of the play. According to some historians, he reigned as the king of Oyo and was a figure feared by both his subjects and, across the Niger, by the Borgu and Nupe empires. He was known for his warring and tyrannical tendencies during his life, and was later deified in tribal history and worshiped by some. His era was one of turbulence and also of intrigue. Duro Ladipo was influenced by the writings of the Rev. Samuel Johnson, a Yoruba historian who used a lot of old Oyo sources for his book on the Yorubas. Duro's play created the image of Sango as a tragic hero.

Plot
The play tries to revisit history by portraying a stout and commanding Sango at the height of his powers as a king. Ever mindful of the wishes of the people and in his desire to please them, he set two of his most powerful chiefs against each other. The chiefs, Gbonka and Timi, had grown too powerful and were becoming a nuisance to the kingdom. However, the plot ends up dividing his cabinet and many of his advisers, friends and a wife, Princess Oya, leave him.

Shango's friend Mogba, rather than join the traitors, desires to redeem the battered image of the king. Mogba invokes incantations, causing thunder and lightning to damage the homes of Sango's enemies.

References

Ogundeji, "Philip Adedotun: The Image of Sango in Duro Ladipo's plays". Research in African Literatures, 1998, pp. 57–75.
Ogunjobi, Oluseyi. "The Creative Development, Importance, and Dramaturgy of Duro Ladipo's Oba Ko so." Cross / Cultures no. 177 (2014): 291–318,350. 
Ọlajubu, Oludare. "The Sources of Duro Ladipọ's "Ọba Kò So"." Research in African Literatures 9, no. 3 (1978): 329–62.

Yoruba mythology
Nigerian plays
Yoruba culture
Plays set in Africa
Yoruba-language literature